Type VII U-boats were the most common type of German World War II U-boat. 703 boats were built by the end of the war.   The lone surviving example, is on display at the Laboe Naval Memorial located in Laboe, Schleswig-Holstein, Germany.

Conception and production 

The Type VII was based on earlier German submarine designs going back to the World War I Type UB III and especially the cancelled Type UG.  The type UG was designed through the Dutch dummy company NV Ingenieurskantoor voor Scheepsbouw Den Haag (I.v.S) to circumvent the limitations of the Treaty of Versailles, and was built by foreign shipyards.  The Finnish Vetehinen class and Spanish Type E-1 also provided some of the basis for the Type VII design. These designs led to the Type VII along with Type I, the latter being built in AG Weser shipyard in Bremen, Germany. The production of Type I was stopped after only two boats; the reasons for this are not certain.  The design of the Type I was further used in the development of the Type VII and Type IX.

Type VII submarines were the most widely used U-boats of the war and were the most produced submarine class in history, with 703 built. The type had several modifications.  The Type VII was the most numerous U-boat type to be involved in the Battle of the Atlantic.

Types

Type VIIA 

Type VIIA U-boats were designed in 1933–34 as the first series of a new generation of attack U-boats. Most Type VIIA U-boats were constructed at Deschimag AG Weser in Bremen with the exception of U-33 through U-36, which were built at Friedrich Krupp Germaniawerft, Kiel. Despite the highly cramped living quarters, type VIIA U-boats were generally popular with their crews because of their fast crash dive speed, which was thought to give them more protection from enemy attacks than bigger, more sluggish types. Also, the smaller boat's lower endurance meant patrols were shorter. They were much more powerful than the smaller Type II U-boats they replaced, with four bow and one external stern torpedo tubes. Usually carrying 11 torpedoes on board, they were very agile on the surface and mounted the  quick-firing deck gun with about 220 rounds.

Ten Type VIIA boats were built between 1935 and 1937.

Type VIIB 

The VIIA had limited fuel capacity, so 24 Type VIIB boats were built between 1936 and 1940 with an additional 33 tonnes of fuel in external saddle tanks, which added another  of range at  surfaced. More powerful engines made them slightly faster than the VIIA. They had two rudders for greater agility. The torpedo armament was improved by moving the aft tube to the inside of the boat. Now an additional aft torpedo could be carried below the deck plating of the aft torpedo room (which also served as the electric motor room) and two watertight compartments under the upper deck could hold two additional torpedoes, giving it a total of 14 torpedoes.

Type VIIBs included many of the most famous U-boats of World War II, including  (the most successful), Günther Prien's , Otto Kretschmer's , and Joachim Schepke's .

Type VIIC 

The Type VIIC was the workhorse of the German U-boat force, with 568 commissioned from 1940 to 1945. The Type VIIC was an effective fighting machine and was seen almost everywhere U-boats operated, although its range of only 8,500 nautical miles was not as great as that of the larger Type IX (11,000 nautical miles), severely limiting the time it could spend in the far reaches of the western and southern Atlantic without refueling from a tender or U-boat tanker. The VIIC came into service toward the end of the "First Happy Time" near the beginning of the war and was still the most numerous type in service when Allied anti-submarine efforts finally defeated the U-boat campaign in late 1943 and 1944.

Type VIIC differed from the VIIB only in the addition of an active sonar and a few minor mechanical improvements, making it 2 feet longer and 8 tons heavier. Speed and range were essentially the same. Many of these boats were fitted with snorkels in 1944 and 1945.

For submerged propulsion, several different electric motors were used. Early models used the VIIB configuration of two AEG GU 460/8-276 electric motors, totaling  with a max rpm of 296, while newer boats used two BBC GG UB 720/8, Garbe, Lahmeyer & Co. RP 137/c or Siemens-Schuckert-Werke (SSW) GU 343/38-8 electric motors with the same power output as the AEG motors.

U-flak "Flak Traps" 
The concept of the "U-flak" or "Flak Trap" originated on 31 August 1942, when  was seriously damaged by aircraft. Rather than scrap the boat, it was decided to refit her as a heavily armed anti-aircraft boat intended to combat the losses being inflicted by Allied aircraft in the Bay of Biscay. Two 20 mm quadruple Flakvierling mounts and an experimental 37 mm automatic gun were installed on the U-flaks' decks. A battery of 86 mm line-carrying anti-aircraft rockets was tested (similar to a device used by the British in the defense of airfields), but this idea proved unworkable. At times, two additional single 20 mm guns were also mounted. The submarines' limited fuel capacities restricted them to operations only within the Bay of Biscay. Only five torpedoes were carried, preloaded in the tubes, to free up space needed for additional gun crew.

Four VIIC boats were modified for use as surface escorts for U-boats departing and returning to French Atlantic bases. Conversion began on three others (and ) but none was completed and they were eventually returned to duty as standard VIIC attack boats.

The modified boats became operational in June 1943 and at first appeared to be successful against a surprised Royal Air Force. Hoping that the extra firepower might allow the boats to survive relentless British air attacks in the Bay of Biscay and reach their operational areas, Donitz ordered the boats to cross the bay in groups at maximum speed. The effort earned the Germans about two more months of relative freedom, until the RAF modified their tactics. When a pilot saw that a U-boat was going to fight on the surface, he held off attacking and called in reinforcements. When several aircraft had arrived, they all attacked at once. If the U-boat dived, surface vessels were called to the scene to scour the area with sonar and drop depth charges. The British also began equipping some aircraft with RP-3 rockets that could sink a U-boat with a single hit, finally making it too dangerous for a U-boat to attempt to fight it out on the surface regardless of its armament. In November 1943, less than six months after the experiment began, it was discontinued. All U-flaks were converted back to standard attack boats and fitted with Turm 4, the standard anti-aircraft armament for U-boats at the time.

Type VIIC/41 

Type VIIC/41 was a slightly modified version of the VIIC and had the same armament and engines. The difference was a stronger pressure hull giving them a deeper crush depth and lighter machinery to compensate for the added steel in the hull, making them slightly lighter than the VIIC. A total of 91 were built.  All of them from  onwards lacked the fittings to handle mines.

Today one Type VIIC/41 still exists:  is on display at Laboe (north of Kiel), the only surviving Type VII in the world.

Type VIIC/42 
The Type VIIC/42 was designed in 1942 and 1943 to replace the aging Type VIIC. It would have had a much stronger pressure hull, with skin thickness up to 28 mm, and would have dived twice as deep as the previous VIICs. These boats would have been very similar in external appearance to the VIIC/41 but with two periscopes in the tower and would have carried two more torpedoes.

Contracts were signed for 164 boats and a few boats were laid down, but all were cancelled on 30 September 1943 in favor of the new Type XXI, and none was advanced enough in construction to be launched.

It was powered by the same engines as the VIIC.

Type VIID 

The type VIID boats, designed in 1939 and 1940, were a lengthened  – by  – version of the VIIC for use as a minelayer. The mines were carried in, and released from, three banks of five vertical tubes just aft of the conning tower. The extended hull also improved fuel and food storage.

On the surface the boat used two supercharged Germaniawerft, 6 cylinder, 4-stroke F46 diesels delivering 3,200 bhp (2,400 kW) at between 470 and 490 rpm. When submerged the boat used two AEG GU 460/8-276 electric motors giving a total of 750 shp (560 kW) at 285 rpm.

Only one managed to survive the war; the other five were sunk, killing all crew members.

Type VIIF 

The Type VIIF boats were designed in 1941 as supply boats to rearm U-boats at sea once they had used up their torpedoes. This required a lengthened hull and they were the largest and heaviest type VII boats built. They were armed identically with the other Type VIIs except that they could have up to 39 torpedoes onboard and had no deck guns.

Only four Type VIIFs were built. Type VIIF U-boats used the same engines as the Type VIID class.
Three were sunk during the war; the surviving boat was surrendered to the Allies following Germany's capitulation. Like most surrendered U-boats, it was subsequently scuttled by the Royal Navy.

Specifications

Notes

References

Bibliography
 
 Rossler, Eberhard (1981). The U-Boat. Annapolis, Maryland (USA): Naval Institute Press. .
 Stern, Robert C. (1991). Type VII U-boats. Annapolis, Maryland (USA): Naval Institute Press. .

 
Submarine classes
World War II submarines of Germany